Charles Brett Helms (born April 16, 1986) is a former American football center. He was signed by the Houston Texans as an undrafted free agent in 2009. He played college football at Louisiana State.

External links
Just Sports Stats
Houston Texans bio
LSU Tigers bio

1986 births
Living people
Sportspeople from Pine Bluff, Arkansas
Players of American football from Arkansas
American football centers
LSU Tigers football players
Houston Texans players
Virginia Destroyers players